is an unstaffed railway station in the town of Kawai, Nara, Japan, serving passengers traveling on Kintetsu Railway's Tawaramoto Line. It is 8.2 km (5.1 miles) from Nishi-Tawaramoto, while 1.9 km (1.2 miles) from Shin-Ōji.

Services 
Trains at Ōwada Station leave for both Nishi-Tawaramoto and Shin-Ōji every 20 minutes, while every 15 minutes during peak hours. Travel time to Nishi-Tawaramoto is about 17 minutes while to Shin-Ōji is about 4 minutes.

The station is serviced by Nara Kotsu Bus Lines' Route 9 bus at Ōwada Sta. Gate from Kataokadai 1-chome once a day, but the services is alighting only. It is also serviced by free shuttle wagon Sunamaru-go'''s North Route and West Route for Sōgō-fukushi-kaikan'' 10 shuttles a day.

Ridership 
As of November 2015, daily passenger ridership was 2,378.

Layout 
Ōwada Station has a high-level island platform with 4 cars long, serving two tracks. On the partly roofed platform, a passenger waiting area with six plastic benches for 28 persons is located. Amenities include bathrooms and a self-service beverage vending machine.

Downstairs below the platform level, there is a ticket booth with two ticket vending machines, and ticket gates with a post-type self-service fare deducting reader. A no-fee bicycle parking, a taxi stand, and a bus stop are located southwest of the station within a minute walk from the ticket gate, but there is no parking spot.

Platform and tracks

Surrounding 
 Owada Post Office
Hakuho College
Nishiyamato Gakuen Junior High School and High School
 Nishiyamato Nursery
 Aeon Cinema Nishiyamato
 Aeon Nishiyamato
 Sandi Nishiyamato
 Nishiyamato New Town

External links
 

Railway stations in Japan opened in 1918
Railway stations in Nara Prefecture